Eunidia paraspilota is a species of beetle in the family Cerambycidae. It was described by Pierre Téocchi, Jiroux, and Jérôme Sudre in 2004.

References

Eunidiini
Beetles described in 2004